Wie Word 'n Miljoenêr? is the second South African version of Who Wants to Be a Millionaire?. It is broadcast on kykNET in the Afrikaans language. It is hosted by Rian van Heerden. The top prize is R1,000,000.

Rules 
In this versions’s FFF (Fastest Finger First), 6 contestants appear.

Lifelines 

 50:50 (Vyftig vyftig)
 Ask The Audience (Oor na die gehoor)
 Phone-A-Friend (Bel ‘n pêl)

Money Tree

Winners

R500 000 winners 
 Theunis Strydom (23 March 2022)

R250 000 winners 
 Francois Brink (2 March 2022)

R125 000 winners 

 Bernie Meyer (17 November 2021)

R40 000 winners 

 Jack O'Reilly (8 December 2021)
 Jeanette Pretorious (15 December 2021)

R30 000 winners 

 Natasha Venter (24 November 2021)

R25 000 winners 

 Hester de Wet (13 April 2022)
 AJ Blignaut (9 February 2022)

R10 000 winners 

 Pieter Spies (27 October 2021)
 Abri Lock (27 October 2021)
 Larochelle Smit (3 November 2021)
 Christine Meintjes (3 November 2021)
 Louis Botha (3 November 2021)
 Enrico Oosthuizen (10 November 2021) 
 Tertius Coetzer (24 November 2021)
 Emil Meyer (1 December 2021)
 Alta Swanepoel (1 December 2021)
 Deidre Daniels (8 December 2021)
 Elsabé Rossouw (15 December 2021)
 Nico Gous (15 December 2021)
 Tiaan Froneman (19 January 2022)

R0 winners 

 Helize Grobler (10 November 2021)

See also 

 Who Wants to Be a Millionaire? (English version of South Africa)

References 

Who Wants to Be a Millionaire?
South African game shows
KykNET original programming
2021 South African television series debuts
2020s South African television series